The Rahway River Parkway is a greenway of parkland along the banks the main stem Rahway River and its tributaries in Union County, New Jersey, United States. Created in the 1920s, it was one of the inaugural projects of the newly-created Union County Parks Commission. It was designed by the Olmsted Brothers firm, sons of landscape architect Frederick Law Olmsted. The Rahway River Greenway plan expands on the original design. Many of the crossings of the river are late 19th century or early 20th century bridges. The East Coast Greenway uses paths and roads along the parkway. 

The parkway intersects with the 7.3-mile main line of the abandoned Rahway Valley Railroad via abandoned rail trestle over the river, which some have advocated for converting to a pedestrian linear park and rail trail.

History

The  idea for the Rahway River Parkway started in 1919 when Union County Sheriff, James E. Warner began a movement to "save" the river by writing to the local paper, The Cranford Citizen, and urging that the river be made into a memorial to the young men who had died in the recent World War I. This was followed by editorials of support in The Rahway Record, The Westfield Leader, The Cranford Citizen, and The Chronicle. On May 5, 1919, the Elizabeth Daily Journal, stated that the idea was "a duty rather than an opportunity.” The Rahway Women's Club sent a resolution of support to the Union County Board of Freeholders.

The Elizabeth Chamber of Commerce had one of its members organize Union County Park Association to urge the creation of a park commission and April 1921, Superior Court Justice James J. Bergen was petitioned to appoint a temporary commission to study the feasibility of such a commission. On April 30, a temporary commission was named and given $10,000.00 and two years to complete the study. Within five months, the group finished the study and returned $8,391.00 of the funds. The emphasis of the report was to move quickly, before the available open space was gone. On the November 8, 1921, ballot, voters were asked to approve a permanent five-member Park Commission and $2.5 million to be spent at the commission's discretion.

The Parkway was created between 1921–1929 following the design of the Olmsted Brothers, sons of landscape architect Frederick Law Olmsted. Many of the crossings of the river are late 19th century or early 20th century bridges.

The Parkway was also dedicated to those who perished in World War I.

Description

The Rahway River consists of four separate branches that converge in Rahway, from whence it flows as a single waterway to its mouth at the Arthur Kill. The longest, or West Branch, courses for 24  miles from Verona. The East Branch rises in West Orange/Montclair and joins the West Branch at Hobart Gap in Springfield forming the main stem of the river. The Nomahegan Brook and Black Brook enter soon thereafter. The original Rahway River Parkway was approximately seven miles. The brooks and main stem through Union, Westfield, Springfield, Cranford, Kenilworth, Winfield, Clark, and Rahway (where it is joined by the Robinsons Branch and the South Branch)  The parkway comprises several county, municipal parks, and trails along the banks of the river. some of which are part of the East Coast Greenway. The river continues into Linden, Woodbridge and Carteret, which also have parks along it, which are part of the 21st century Rahway River Greenway Plan.

Parks and features along the Rahway

Gallery

See also
Union County Park Commission Administration Buildings
Elizabeth River Parkway
Warinanco Park
Watchung Reservation
List of crossings of the Rahway River
City Beautiful movement
Houdaille Quarry
Historic sites in Cranford, New Jersey
List of bridges documented by the Historic American Engineering Record in New Jersey

References

External links 

Paths, Trails and Greenways Union County
Google: Along the Rahway River

Rahway River Association

Protected areas of Union County, New Jersey
Nature reserves in New Jersey
Linden, New Jersey
Rahway, New Jersey
Cranford, New Jersey
Clark, New Jersey
Winfield Township, New Jersey
Rahway River
Springfield Township, Union County, New Jersey
Greenways
Parks in Union County, New Jersey
County parks in New Jersey